William Ormston (12 August 1895 – 1950) was a British cyclist. He competed in the men's tandem event at the 1920 Summer Olympics.

References

External links
 

1895 births
1950 deaths
British male cyclists
Olympic cyclists of Great Britain
Cyclists at the 1920 Summer Olympics
Place of birth missing